Leslie is a special service area in the Rural Municipality of Elfros No. 307, Saskatchewan, Canada. Listed as a designated place by Statistics Canada, the community had a population of 15 in the Canada 2016 Census. The community is located just off of Highway 16 between Foam Lake and Elfros.

The first post office was established in 1909 as Leslie Station (with C. A. Clarke as postmaster), with the name of the community changed to Leslie in 1962. The last postmaster was Victoria Ann St. Amand in 1987.

Demographics 

See also

 List of communities in Saskatchewan
 Special service area
 Designated place

References 

Designated places in Saskatchewan
Elfros No. 307, Saskatchewan
Former villages in Saskatchewan
Special service areas in Saskatchewan
Icelandic settlements in Saskatchewan
Populated places disestablished in 2006
Division No. 10, Saskatchewan